Events from the year 1853 in Canada.

Incumbents
Monarch — Victoria

Federal government
Parliament: 4th

Governors
Governor General of the Province of Canada — James Bruce, 8th Earl of Elgin
Colonial Governor of Newfoundland — Charles Henry Darling
Governor of New Brunswick — Edmund Walker Head
Governor of Nova Scotia — John Gaspard Le Marchant
Governor of Prince Edward Island — Dominick Daly

Premiers
Joint Premiers of the Province of Canada —
Francis Hincks, Canada West Premier
Augustin-Norbert Morin, Canada East Premier 
Premier of Nova Scotia — James Boyle Uniacke
Premier of Prince Edward Island — John Holl

Events
February 23 – A description of the proposed bridge across the St. Lawrence is published.
June 6 – Gavazzi Riot in Quebec are quelled by military.
June 26 – Investigation of the riot proceeds, at Montreal.
July – Irregular calling of jurors delays trial for riot.
July 15 – The Grand Trunk Railway merges numerous smaller Canadian railways into a conglomerate, while also leasing an American railway, the Atlantic and St. Lawrence Railroad, giving it access to the year-round Atlantic port at Portland, Maine.

Full date unknown
Mary Ann Shadd becomes the first woman in North America to become editor of a newspaper. Working out of Chatham, Ontario, she publishes, edits and writes in the Provincial Freeman, a newspaper serving the Black community in Ontario.
Russian explorer-trappers find oil seeps in Cook Inlet.

Births
February 15 – Rodmond Roblin, businessman, politician and 9th Premier of Manitoba (died 1937)
March 23 – Donald Mann, railway contractor and entrepreneur (died 1934)
July 18 – William McGuigan, politician and 10th Mayor of Vancouver (died 1908)
August 10 – Pierre-Évariste Leblanc, politician and Lieutenant Governor of Quebec (died 1918)
September 25 – Henry Emmerson, lawyer, businessman, politician, philanthropist and 8th Premier of New Brunswick (died 1914)
November 13 – Joseph Boutin Bourassa, politician (died 1943)
December 19 – Charles Fitzpatrick, lawyer, politician and 5th Chief Justice of Canada (died 1942)

Deaths
February 5 – Thomas Talbot, army and militia officer, settlement promoter, office holder, and politician (born 1771)
March 31 – William Crane, merchant, justice of the peace, judge, and politician (born 1785)
June 7 – Norbert Provencher, clergyman, missionary and Bishop (born 1787)
June 28 – Benjamin Eby, Mennonite bishop and founder of Ebytown in Upper Canada (born 1785)
July 11 – William Allan, banker and politician (born 1770)
November 8 – Friedrich Gaukel, farmer, distiller and innkeeper who helped to transform the pioneer settlement of Ebytown into Berlin, Ontario

References 

 
Canada
Years of the 19th century in Canada
1853 in North America